1st Force Reconnaissance Company conducts deep reconnaissance and direct action raids in support of I Marine Expeditionary Force requirements across the range of military operations to include crisis response, expeditionary operations and major combat operations. 1st Force Recon Company was deactivated 26 October 2006 and the majority of the personnel were used to create 1st Marine Special Operations Battalion.

Prior to the deactivation, General James Mattis, the MEF Commanding General at the time, transferred two Force Recon platoons to 1st Reconnaissance Battalion and activated the Deep Reconnaissance Company. In 2008 Delta Company, 1st Recon Company was redesignated the I MEF Force Reconnaissance Company and given its own Marine Command Code (MCC). It continues to provide I Marine Expeditionary Force and its subordinate MAGTFs with Corps level reconnaissance, battlespace shaping and direct action raids.

Mission
The 1st Force Reconnaissance Company of the United States Marine Corps was a Force Reconnaissance unit that organized, trained, and equipped reconnaissance units to support the I Marine Expeditionary Force.

1st Force Recon Company conducted nine Mission Essential Tasks (METs).

MET 1: Plan, coordinate and conduct amphibious / ground reconnaissance and surveillance to observe, identify and report enemy activity, and collect other information of military significance
MET 2: Conduct specialized reconnaissance. Assist in specialized engineer, NBC, radio, mobile and other unique reconnaissance missions
MET 3: Conduct Initial Terminal Guidance (ITG) for helicopters, landing craft and parachutists
MET 4: Designate and engage selected targets with Force Fires and other operations to support battlespace shaping. This includes terminal guidance of precision-guided munitions
MET 5: Conduct post-strike reconnaissance to determine and report battle damage to a specific target or area
MET 6: Conduct counter-reconnaissance
MET 7: Conduct limited scale raids
MET 8: Conduct insertion / extraction of reconnaissance forces in support of recon operations
MET 9: Conduct other operations as directed by the supported commander

Organization
1st Force Recon Company's table of organization consisted of a headquarters and service platoon and six Force Reconnaissance platoons. 1st Force would often be augmented by reserve forces from 3rd and 4th Force Recon Companies for combat deployments.

History

First Force Reconnaissance Company was activated on 19 June 1957 at Camp Margarita (Area 33), Marine Corps Base Camp Pendleton, California. It was formed from the Reconnaissance Platoon of Marine Corps Test Unit#1 that was assigned to take over the guideon of 1st Amphibious Reconnaissance Company, that was under command of Captain "Cycle" Michael Sparks. Many Marines from the amphib recon company and 1st Reconnaissance Battalion augmented the new Fleet Marine Force-level reconnaissance capabilities to force commanders.

The Company's first company commander was Major Bruce F. Meyers, with Captain Joseph Z. Taylor as his executive officer. Meyers was MCTU#1's project test officer that led the development and refinement of submarine insertions/extractions techniques, low level static line and military free fall parachute insertion, the closed-circuit SCUBA procedures and capabilities developed the initial deep reconnaissance capability within the Department of Defense. 1st Force Recon pioneered the High Altitude Low Opening (HALO) parachuting technique in 1958 that allowed for a more secure and accurate insertion of a deep reconnaissance team.

By 1958, approximately half of the 1st Force Reconnaissance Company was reassigned and transferred to Marine Corps Base Camp Lejeune, North Carolina to form the 2nd Force Reconnaissance Company; under command of Joseph Z. Taylor, promoted to Major.

1st Platoon, Sub Unit #1, embarked onto the USS Cook (APD-130) and sailed for southern Thailand, to the Royal Thai Navy base of Sattahip, in December 1964. The 1st Platoon conducted reconnaissance patrols with the Royal Thai Marine Corps, with one Thai Marine attached to each of the 4-man force recon teams. By the end of January, they finished their recon operations in Thailand and sailed for Vietnam for the planned amphibious landings in March 1965.

Vietnam War

Prior to the first Marine amphibious landings made by the 9th Marine Expeditionary Brigade in March 1965, 1st Platoon, Sub Unit #1, 1st Force Reconnaissance Company (-) led by Captain David Whittingham, conducted preliminary reconnaissance of the planned amphibious beach landing sites from 23-7 February 1965.

By early May 1965, the 2nd Platoon had joined 1st Platoon with the Subordinate Unit #1 and both platoons were assigned to the United States Special Forces A-Team, A-103, conducting specialized reconnaissance and combat raiding missions. They operated from Da Nang, Phu Bai, Chu Lai, Gia Vuc and Kham Duc, in the I Corps Tactical Zone (ICTZ). Their mission was to collect any enemy intelligence in the mountain approaches to the Marines' tactical area of operation along with the Laos border, and to report any findings directly to the general staff of the III Marine Amphibious Force.

November 1965, 2nd Platoon was attached to the Special Forces team A-106 at Ba To. A combined patrol from Ba To was attacked on the night of 16 December and three Marines, a Green Beret Sergeant, and 10 members of the Civilian Irregular Defense Group (CIDG) were killed. By mid-December 1965, 3rd platoon arrived in the Republic of Vietnam and was attached to Special Forces team A-107 at Tra Bong. The rest of the Force Recon Company (its remaining two platoons, 4th and 5th Plt.) arrived in June 1965. The company departed South Vietnam in August 1970. They conducted more than 2,200 reconnaissance patrols and participated in numerous operations, including the battle for Hue City. 

1st Force was deactivated on 30 September 1974 and its personnel rolled into the deep reconnaissance company of 1st Reconnaissance Battalion.

Marine Expeditionary Unit (Special Operations Capable) MEU(SOC)
General Alfred M. Gray, the 29th Commandant of the Marine Corps, pioneered a Marine Expeditionary Unit (Special Operations Capable) (SOC) concept in 1987 and reactivated 1st, 2nd and 5th Force Reconnaissance Companies to support these newly formed MAGTFs with direct action raids and reconnaissance operations. 
On 11–13 November 1994, the Force Recon Marines aboard the 13th Marine Expeditionary Unit conducted a Maritime Interdiction Operation/Visit Board Search and Seizure (MIO/VBSS) mission aboard the Honduran-flagged merchant vessel Ajmer, which was in violation of United Nations sanctions on Iraq.

The 11th MEU Force Reconnaissance Platoon supported a Non-combatant evacuation operation in Asmara, Eritrea, on 6 June 1998. Operation Safe Departure was conducted as a precautionary measure to ensure the safety of American citizens in the midst of a heated border dispute between Eritrea and Ethiopia. All total, 172 persons, including 105 Americans, were safely evacuated to Amman, Jordan, via KC-130 aerial transport. The Force Recon platoon provided embassy reinforcement and security for the MEU forward command element.

Force Reconnaissance Marines on the 11th MEU, 13th MEU and 15th MEU supported humanitarian assistance operations in East Timor in 1999 and 2000.

Operation Desert Shield/Desert Storm
In 1990 1st Force Reconnaissance company was deployed to Kuwait in support of Operation Desert Shield. Force Reconnaissance Marines established observation posts and conducted motorized patrols along the Kuwaiti Border. Operation Desert Storm was launched in January 1991. Force Recon teams located enemy armored units and utilized artillery and Close Air Support to interdict them

Operation Restore Hope
In 1993 7th Platoon deployed with the 15th MEU and conducted amphibious reconnaissance along the Somali coastline. Two teams infiltrated the Mogadishu port facility, established observation positions at the Mogadishu airport, and supported a raid company from 1st Battalion, 7th Marines with fire support. The remainder of 1st Force flew into the airport and conducted reconnaissance and raids in support of the United Task Force (UNITAF). They also provided Personal Security Detachments for high-ranking officials to include General Johnston, the UNITAF Commanding General, and Colonel Wilhelm who commanded the Marine component of UNITAF.

Global War on terrorism
In 2001, 2nd Platoon was deployed in support of the 15th MEU and participated in the invasion of Afghanistan,

In 2003, 1st Force Recon Company, augmented with platoons from 3rd Force Reconnaissance Company and 4th Force, participated in the invasion of Iraq. 3rd Platoon, deployed in support of the 15th MEU went ashore during the invasion and participated in the battle of Nasiriyah and supported the rescue of PFC Jessica Lynch

In 2004 a Force Recon Platoon deployed in support of the 11th MEU participated in the Battle of Najaf and a platoon was attached to Regimental Combat Team 1 for Operation Phantom Fury, commonly known as the Battle of Fallujah.

In 2005–2006, 1st Force Recon Company, augmented with platoons from 3d and 4th Reconnaissance BN, participated in the Operation Iraqi Freedom. Platoons participated in numerous campaigns during this time to include Operation Matador in the city of Al Qaim, and Operation Sword in the town of Hit.

In 2010, 2nd Platoon was deployed to the Gulf of Aden along the Somali coast to assist the 15th Marine Expeditionary Unit in recapturing the MV Magellan Star.

Training

During its beginning formation within the 1st Marine Division, 1st Force Recon conducted sustainment training in obstacle clearing for landing zone preparation in support of early-Marine Corps helicopter-borne operations; and other mission-essential amphibious reconnaissance, parachute insertion, and pathfinder tasks. Because of the efforts made by Meyers and his other adjoining Marine and Navy parachute testers, they developed the Helicopter Rope Suspension methods, plus invented the Special Personnel Insertion/Extraction (SPIE) rigging that are widely used by Special Operations Forces services worldwide.

During the late 1990s and early 2000s, 1st Force Recon Company trained in a variety of locations during their Unit Training Phase.

These locations included:

Joint Readiness Training Center, Fort Polk, Louisiana
Fort Lewis, Washington
Mountain Warfare Training Center, California
Yuma Proving Ground, Arizona
Fort Irwin Military Reservation, California
Naval Air Weapons Station China Lake, California
Naval Amphibious Base Coronado, California

References

 Field Manual (FM) 7-92, The Infantry Reconnaissance Platoon and Squad (Airborne, Air Assault, Light Infantry) 
 Marine Corps Reference Publication (MCRP) 2-1C, Marine Air Ground Task Force Intelligence Dissemination 
 Marine Corps Order (MCO) 3500.20B, Marine Corps Parachuting and Diving Policy and Program Administration 
 Marine Corps Warfighting Publication (MCWP) 2-1, Intelligence Operations 
 MCO 3500.42A, Marine Corps Helicopter Rope Suspension Techniques (HRST) Policy and Program Administration 
 MCO 1510.125, Individual Training Standards (ITS) Systems for Marine Combat Water Survival Training (MCWST) 
 MCO 3502.2A, Marine Expeditionary Units (Special Operations Capable) (MEU(SOC)) Special Skills Certification Program 
 MCO 3502.3A, Marine Expeditionary Unit (Special Operations Capable) Predeployment Training Program (PTP)

External links
Marine widow travels to Vietnam and finds her MIA husband's F-4 jet crash site who was supporting 1st Force Recon

United States Marine Corps Force Reconnaissance
Companies of the United States Marine Corps